Argopteron puelmae is a butterfly of the family Hesperiidae. It was described by Calvert in 1888. It is found in Chile.

References

 Argopteron puelmae in butterfliesofamerica

Butterflies described in 1888
Heteropterinae
Hesperiidae of South America
Endemic fauna of Chile